Physalaemus maculiventris is a species of frog in the family Leptodactylidae. It is endemic to Southeast and South Brazil and is known primarily from the Serra do Mar in Espírito Santo, Rio de Janeiro, São Paulo state, Paraná, and Santa Catarina states. Common name Mantagnes dwarf frog has been proposed for it.

Description
Adult males measure  and adult females  in snout–vent length. The snout is pointed or pointed-subelliptical in dorsal view and acute or rounded-acute in profile. The tympanum is not visible. The finger and toe tips are rounded or slightly swollen but without discs; webbing is also absent. The dorsum is brown and tan with yellow outlining. The hands and feet have orange highlights. The iris is bronze. Males have a single vocal sac.

Habitat and conservation
It is terrestrial frog usually found near temporary ponds or in the water. Breeding takes place in temporary ponds where a foam nest is built.

Physalaemus maculiventris is a common species, but it can be threatened by habitat loss caused by agriculture, livestock grazing, clear-cutting, tourism, and human settlement. It is found in several protected areas.

References

maculiventris
Frogs of South America
Amphibians of Brazil
Endemic fauna of Brazil
Amphibians described in 1925
Taxa named by Adolfo Lutz
Taxonomy articles created by Polbot